The 2019 season of the Tamil Nadu Premier League, was the fourth season of the TNPL, a professional Twenty20 cricket league established by the Tamil Nadu Cricket Association (TNCA) in 2016.

Venues

Teams

Points Table 

Source: TNCA

  Advance to the qualifiers
  Advance  to the eliminator
  Eliminate from Tournament

Playoffs

References 

Tamil Nadu Premier League
2019 in Indian cricket
Cricket in Tamil Nadu